Robert Nnanna Okereke (born July 29, 1996) is an American football linebacker for the New York Giants of the National Football League (NFL). He played college football at Stanford and was drafted by the Indianapolis Colts in the third round of the 2019 NFL Draft.

Early years
Okereke was born in Santa Ana, California to parents who emigrated from Nigeria. He attended and played high school football at Foothill High School.

College career
Okereke attended and played college football at Stanford. He redshirted as a freshman in 2014. He contributed on the field from 2015 to 2018. He recorded 227 total tackles (20.0 were for loss), 10.5 sacks, one interception (a 52-yard pick-six), eight passes defensed, one fumble recovery, and three forced fumbles. He was named Pac 12 Honorable Mention in 2017 and 2018

Collegiate statistics

Professional career

Indianapolis Colts
Okereke was drafted by the Indianapolis Colts in the third round (89th overall) of the 2019 NFL Draft. The pick was announced by former Colts punter Pat McAfee. He made his NFL debut in the season opener against the Los Angeles Chargers. He earned his first career start in Week 3 against the Atlanta Falcons. In Week 13 against the Tennessee Titans, Okereke recorded a strip sack on Ryan Tannehill which was recovered by teammate Justin Houston in the 31–17 loss. This was Okereke's first career sack in the NFL.

In Week 5 of the 2020 season against the Cleveland Browns, Okereke recorded his first career interception off a pass thrown by Baker Mayfield during the 32–23 loss.

New York Giants
On March 16, 2023, Okereke signed a four-year contract with the New York Giants.

Legal issues
Okereke was the subject of a sexual assault investigation at Stanford in 2015. Three members of the university's five-person investigative panel concluded Okereke committed sexual assault, but the ruling didn't cross the 4-1 threshold necessary to pursue further punitive action. Okereke has maintained that the allegations are untrue.

References

External links
Indianapolis Colts bio
Stanford Cardinals bio

1996 births
Living people
Sportspeople from Santa Ana, California
Players of American football from California
American football linebackers
American sportspeople of Nigerian descent
Stanford Cardinal football players
Indianapolis Colts players
New York Giants players